Meinel is a surname. Notable people with the surname include:

Aden Meinel (1922–2011), American astronomer
Carolyn Meinel (CPM) (born 1946), notable in the hacking scene during the 1990s
Christel Meinel, former East German cross country skier
Christoph Meinel (born 1954), German scientist and university professor of computer sciences
Dieter Meinel, former East Germany cross country skier
Dietmar Meinel, German Nordic combined skier
Gabriele Meinel, German cross country skier
Marjorie Meinel (1922–2008), American astronomer
Reinhard Meinel, German physicist
Rico Meinel (born 1974), retired German ski jumper

See also
Meinel (disambiguation)
Meynell

Surnames from given names
de:Meinel